Winter of Apokalypse was an American black metal band from Portland, Oregon, in the mid-1990s through 2015, consisting mostly of previous members of Thy Infernal, known for their raw and grim sound. The band used satanic images in their artwork and in their stage apparel during performances. However, their extreme presentation did not stop at their sound or their appearance. Even the pseudonyms the band members adopted were extreme: the drummer is named Armageddon, the bassist is named Slut, and their guitarist chose the name Fascist.

Both their album and their EPs received positive reviews among the black metal community.

Discography

Studio albums 
 Solitary Winter Night (2004) - Released on Moribund Records

EPs 
 Winter of the Apokalypse (2015) - Released on Plastik Musik

Demos 
 Demo (1999)
 Winter of Apokalypse (2003)

Members 
 Hell – vocals
 Fascist - guitar
 Slut – guitar
 Alkaholik – bass guitar
 Armageddon – drums

References 

American black metal musical groups
Heavy metal musical groups from Oregon